Michael Harle (born 31 October 1972) is an English footballer who played as a defender in the Football League. He was born in Lewisham, London.He retired aged 27 due to a foot injury.

References

External links
Mike Harle's Career

1972 births
Living people
English footballers
Footballers from Lewisham
Association football defenders
Gillingham F.C. players
Sittingbourne F.C. players
Bury F.C. players
Millwall F.C. players
Welling United F.C. players
Barnet F.C. players
English Football League players